The 1976 US Open was a tennis tournament that took place on the outdoor Har-Tru clay courts at the West Side Tennis Club in Forest Hills, Queens, in New York City, United States. The tournament ran from 1 until 12 September. It was the 96th staging of the US Open, and the fourth Grand Slam tennis event of 1976. It was the second year in which this tournament was played on clay courts.

Seniors

Men's singles

 Jimmy Connors defeated  Björn Borg, 6–4, 3–6, 7–6(11-9), 6–4
It was Connors's 4th career Grand Slam title, and his 2nd US Open title.

Women's singles

 Chris Evert defeated  Evonne Goolagong Cawley 6–3, 6–0
It was Evert's 6th career Grand Slam title, and her 2nd (consecutive) US Open title.

Men's doubles

 Tom Okker /  Marty Riessen defeated  Paul Kronk / Cliff Letcher 6–4, 6–4

Women's doubles

 Delina Boshoff /  Ilana Kloss defeated  Olga Morozova /  Virginia Wade 6–1, 6–4

Mixed doubles

 Billie Jean King /  Phil Dent defeated  Betty Stöve /  Frew McMillan 3–6, 6–2, 7–5

Juniors

Boys' singles
 Ricardo Ycaza defeated  José Luis Clerc 6–4, 5–7, 6–0

Girls' singles
 Marise Kruger defeated  Lucia Romanov 6–3, 7–5

Prize money

References

External links
Official US Open website

 
 

 
US Open
US Open (tennis) by year
US Open
US Open
US Open
US Open